"I Got the Sun in the Mornin' (and the Moon at Night)" is a song from the 1946 musical Annie Get Your Gun, written by Irving Berlin and originally performed by Ethel Merman. Hit recordings in 1946 were by Les Brown (vocal by Doris Day) (No. 10 in the Billboard charts) and by Artie Shaw (vocal by Mel Torme) (No. 17).

Other singers to have recorded the song include Doris Day, Betty Hutton (in the 1950 movie version of Annie Get Your Gun), Bernadette Peters, Judy Garland, Dean Martin and June Christy with the Stan Kenton Orchestra.

The Cheers episode, "Unplanned Parenthood" first aired on October 24, 1991, written by Tracy Newman & Jonathan Stark writers of Ellen Degeneres's 'Puppy Episode', begins with the character of Carla Tortelli opening the bar and starting the jukebox, playing "I Got the Sun in the Mornin'" to which she uncharacteristically sings and dances.

In the Hawaii Five-0 episode, "Hau'oli La Ho'omaika'i," first aired on November 22, 2013, guest star Carol Burnett ends the show by singing the song.

Stig Bergendorff and Gösta Bernhard wrote the Swedish lyrics betitled "Jag har solen och månen". Per Grundén with Orchestra Conductor: Hans Schreiber recorded it in Stockholm on August 19, 1949. It was released on the 78 rpm record His Master's Voice X 7540.

References

Songs from Annie Get Your Gun
Songs written by Irving Berlin
1946 songs
Doris Day songs
Ethel Merman songs
Mel Tormé songs